This is a list of composers from Kosovo:

References

Kosovan